Ochsner Health System is a not-for-profit health system based in the New Orleans metropolitan area of southeast Louisiana, United States. 
 it is the largest non-profit, academic healthcare system operating in Louisiana, with 40 medical facilities across the state.   
Its flagship hospital, Ochsner Medical Center, has been ranked the number one hospital in Louisiana for the past decade.   
It also has other clinics and medical centers in Greater New Orleans, Baton Rouge, Shreveport, Monroe, Lafayette, and other locations across Louisiana and Mississippi.

History

Ochsner was founded by Dr. Alton Ochsner.

Adeptus Health reached an agreement with the Ochsner Health System to build and operate emergency rooms in Louisiana under the Ochsner name in September 2016.

During the COVID-19 pandemic in Louisiana, the Ochsner Health System was strained by surges in patient volume. In part, efforts to provide healthcare were complicated by resistance to vaccination among healthcare workers, and the effects of Hurricane Ida.   
In 2021 Oschner stated that employees with spouses who did not take the COVID-19 vaccine will pay more for health insurance.

Ochsner reported a drop of $74M in operating income in 2021, attributed to the effects of Hurricane Ida and the COVID-19 pandemic.

In June of 2021, a significant Gulf Coast expansion was announced. Ochsner took over Rush Health System in Mississippi and Alabama.

Ochsner Health System hospitals
 Louisiana
 Ochsner Medical Center - Jefferson
 Leonard J. Chabert Medical Center - Houma
 Ochsner Baptist Medical Center (formerly Memorial Medical Center) - New Orleans
 Ochsner Hospital for Children - New Orleans
 Ochsner Medical Center – Baton Rouge (formerly Summit Hospital) - Baton Rouge
 Ochsner LSU Health Shreveport (formerly University Health) - Shreveport
 Ochsner LSU Health Shreveport - Monroe Medical Center (formerly University Health - EA Conway) - Monroe
 Ochsner Medical Center – Kenner (formerly Kenner Regional Medical Center) - Kenner
 Ochsner Medical Center – Northshore (formerly NorthShore Regional Medical Center) - Slidell
 Ochsner Medical Center – West Bank (formerly Meadowcrest Hospital) - Gretna
 Ochsner Medical Complex – Iberville - Plaquemine
 Ochsner St. Anne General Hospital (formerly St. Anne General Hospital) - Raceland
 St. Bernard Parish Hospital - Chalmette
 St. Charles Parish Hospital - Luling

Ochsner Lafayette General Medical Center campuses (formerly Lafayette General Health System)
 Ochsner Lafayette General Medical Center (formerly Lafayette General Medical Center) - Lafayette
 Ochsner Abrom Kaplan Memorial Hospital (formerly Abrom Memorial Hospital) - Kaplan
 Ochsner Acadia General Hospital (formerly American Legion Acadia Post 15 Hospital) - Crowley
 Ochsner St. Martin Hospital (formerly Gary Memorial Hospital) - Breaux Bridge
 Heart and Vascular Center of Acadiana - Lafayette
 Ochsner Lafayette General Orthopedic Hospital - Lafayette
 Ochsner Lafayette General Surgical Hospital - Lafayette
 Ochsner University Hospital (formerly LSU University Medical Center) - Lafayette

 Mississippi
 Ochsner Hancock Medical Center - Bay St. Louis

References

External links
 ochsner.org

Healthcare in Louisiana